Marietta is a hamlet in Onondaga County, New York, United States, southwest of Syracuse.

Hamlets in New York (state)
Hamlets in Onondaga County, New York